The International Partnership for Microbicides or IPM is a non-profit product development partnership (PDP) founded by Dr. Zeda Rosenberg in 2002 to prevent HIV transmission by accelerating the development and availability of a safe and effective microbicide for use by women in developing countries.

Since its inception, IPM has focused on developing HIV-prevention products for women including gels, films, tablets and rings that contain antiretroviral (ARV)-based microbicides. Rights to incorporate existing ARVs into products developed specifically for use in developing countries have been negotiated with pharmaceutical companies working in the HIV field.

See also
 International AIDS Society
 Joint United Nations Programme on HIV/AIDS (UNAIDS)
 Prince Leopold Institute of Tropical Medicine
 Tibotec

References

External links
 International Partnership for Microbicides

HIV/AIDS organizations in the United States
Microbicides
Medical and health organizations based in Maryland